Wolf's Rain soundtracks may refer to:

Wolf's Rain Original Soundtrack Vol. 1
Wolf's Rain Original Soundtrack Vol. 2